Zymophilus paucivorans is a species of anaerobic, Gram-negative, rod-shaped bacteria first isolated from spoilt beer. It is the type species of its genus.

References

Further reading
Sneath, Peter HA, et al. Bergey's manual of systematic bacteriology. Volume 3. Williams & Wilkins, 2012.
Dworkin, Martin, and Stanley Falkow, eds. The Prokaryotes: Vol. 4: Bacteria: Firmicutes, Cyanobacteria. Vol. 4. Springer, 2006.
Juvonen, Riikka. "DNA-based detection and characterisation of strictly anaerobic beer-spoilage bacteria." VTT Publications (2009).
Priest, Fergus G., and Iain Campbell, eds. Brewing microbiology. Chapman & Hall, 1996.

External links

LPSN

Veillonellaceae
Bacteria described in 1990